Leucadendron salignum, also known as the common sunshine conebush, is an evergreen, dioecious shrub that produces several stems from the ground of up to  high; forming part of the genus Leucadendron from the family Proteaceae. It survives the wildfires that occur every one or two decades in the fynbos where it occurs by regrowing from an underground rootstock. Pollinated by beetles, it flowers from April to November. The winged seeds remain in the woody cones until they are released after a fire, and are distributed by the wind. It is possibly the most common Proteaceae species in South Africa, and can be found in the Northern Cape, Western Cape and Eastern Cape provinces. Its current conservation status is Least Concern.

Description
Like in all species of Leucadendron, the male and female flower heads are on different plants.

The involucral leaves are often ivory in colour and may conceal the head. Inflorescences can be either yellow or red. The mature bracts are covered with densely matted woolly hairs on the outside.

Taxonomy
The common sunshine conebush was first described by Swedish botanist Peter Jonas Bergius in 1766, who named it Leucadendron salignum. The species name is the Latin adjective salignus "made of willow-wood". Scottish botanist Robert Brown called the species L. adscendens in his 1810 work On the natural order of plants called Proteaceae. Carl Meisner gave it the name L. involucratum in 1856.

A comparison of homologous DNA indicates that L. salignum may be most closely related to L. lanigerum, followed by a clade consisting of L. flexuosum and L. discolor.

It is called common sunshine conebush in English and knoppiesgeelbos in Afrikaans.

Distribution, habitat and ecology
The common sunshine conebush is a widespread and common species found from Nieuwoudtville in the north to the Cape Peninsula in the southwest and Grahamstown in the east. It copes with a wide range of soil types, and can be found from sea level to about  altitude.

Like all Leucadendron species, L. salignum has separate male and female plants. This species is pollinated by small beetles, including the sap beetle species Pria cinerascens and the Adonis ladybird (Hippodamia variegata).  The winged seeds remain in the cone on the female plant for many years on end, until they are released after a fire kills the above ground biomass. The mature plants usually do not die, but regrow from the underground rootstock.

Uses
The common sunshine conebush has a very long flowering season, that stretches from May to December and a colourful involucre that surrounds the flower heads. It also regrows well in response to deep pruning, and this species and several of its hybrids and cultivars are widely used for  cut foliage production.

Leucadendron ‘Safari Sunset' is a hybrid bred from a red form of L. salignum and L. laureolum. First bred in New Zealand in the 1960s, it is grown commercially in Israel and exported worldwide as a cut flower.

References

salignum
Endemic flora of South Africa
Plants described in 1766
Taxa named by Peter Jonas Bergius